This is a discography for Japanese pop group, Speed.

Albums

Studio albums

Live albums

Compilation albums

Singles

Notes

References 

Discographies of Japanese artists
Pop music group discographies